Cylindrommata is a genus of beetles in the family Cerambycidae, containing the following species:

 Cylindrommata aurantia Monne & Mermudes, 2009
 Cylindrommata longissima Tippmann, 1960
 Cylindrommata lustrata Monne & Mermudes, 2009
 Cylindrommata susanae Monne & Mermudes, 2009

References

Rhinotragini